Nezlobte dědečka is a 1934 Czech comedy film directed by Karel Lamač.

Cast
 Vlasta Burian  as Eman Vovísek/Uncle Jonathan
 Čeněk Šlégl as Factory owner Adolf Daněk
 Adina Mandlová as Liduška, Daněk's wife
 Hana Vítová as Secretary Josefinka
 Václav Trégl as Daněk's butler
 Jan W. Speerger as Daněk's gardener
 Mariana Hellerová as Aunt Matylda
 Theodor Pištěk as Uncle Hanibal
 Ljuba Hermanová as Dancer Káťa
 Antonín Vaverka as Káťa's fiancé
 Máňa Hanková as Káťa's friend
 Jaroslav Marvan as Dr. Karner

References

External links
 

1934 films
1934 comedy films
Films directed by Karel Lamač
Czechoslovak comedy films
Czechoslovak black-and-white films
1930s Czech films